Maris Stella School is a private Roman Catholic day school for girls from three + to eighteen years old (grades 000-12 or pre-primary, primary and secondary phases), located on the Berea in Durban, KwaZulu-Natal, South Africa.

It was founded on May 22, 1899, by the Holy Family Sisters as a boarding school. It declared a non-racial policy in 1974. It has c. 830 pupils. The principal is Joan Schmidt.

The name of the school, Maris Stella, is Latin, and means Star of the sea. The school motto is Suspice confide, which is Latin, and means Look up and trust.

The school's official newsletter is called The Anchor.

Notable alumnae
 Diana Napier, film actress
 Bree O'Mara, novelist, ballet dancer, TV producer and air hostess

References

External links
Maris Stella official site
Maris Stella Old Girls Directory

Catholic schools in South Africa
Catholic secondary schools in South Africa
Private schools in KwaZulu-Natal
Educational institutions established in 1899
Girls' schools in South Africa
Education in Durban
1899 establishments in the Colony of Natal